Jan Otto Myrseth (born 2 July 1957) is a Norwegian prelate who is the current Bishop of Tunsberg.

Biography
Myrseth completed his theological studies in 1988 and was ordained in the summer of 1989. After serving as vicar in the Diocese of Tunsberg since 1989, he was appointed vicar of the parish of Norderhov in 1991. On December 17, 2004, he was appointed Dean of the Ringerike deanery. He was appointed to the office on Sunday, April 24, 2005. Myrseth also served as a hospital chaplain and as lecturer at the theological faculty of the Theological seminary of the University of Oslo. In 2010 he became the Provost of Bergen Cathedral. On June 6, 2018, he was elected as bishop of Tunsberg by the Church Council and was consecrated in September of the same year.

References

1957 births
Living people
People from Sykkylven
Bishops of Tunsberg
21st-century Lutheran bishops